Kaffraria ("Land of the Kaffirs") was a name for regions held by the Xhosa outside the authority of British South Africa, particularly the southeast part of South Africa's Eastern Cape.

Kaffraria may also refer to:

 Other areas held by the Xhosa in what is now Transkei
 Diocese of Kaffraria, now renamed Mthatha
 Cafreria, a vague territory during the Age of Exploration usually including the Namibian coast and surrounding areas
 British Kaffraria, a formally established colony beside the Kaffraria described above
 SS Kaffraria, a British cargo ship
 Kaffraria, a genus of shield bugs in the tribe Phyllocephalini